Loureedia phoenixi is a species of spider discovered in Iran in the year 2020. The species is categorized as a velvet spider.  The spider is described as reclusive. It is named after the actor Joaquin Phoenix, for a color pattern which matches the movie character Joker from D.C. Comics. Loureedia phoenixi is the first of its genus to be found not in the Mediterranean, which is over 1500 kilometers away from the rest of the genus.

See also
 List of organisms named after famous people (born 1950–present)

References

Eresidae
Spiders described in 2020
Insects of Iran
Spiders of Western Asia